Fairpoint may refer to:

Fairpoint, Ohio
Fairpoint, South Dakota
FairPoint Communications